During the 1999–2000 season, the Spanish football club Deportivo Alavés placed 6th in La Liga. The team reached the second round of the Copa del Rey.

Season summary

1999–2000 was Alavés's third season under head coach Mané, who guided them to the Segunda División title in his first season, and led them to La Liga survival with 16th place in 1998–99. The success continued in the club's second top flight campaign, as Alavés finished in sixth place, the best result in their history. This qualified them for the first round of the 2000–01 UEFA Cup, their first ever European campaign, where they went on to reach the final before losing 5–4 to a Liverpool golden goal. They had somewhat less success in the Copa del Rey, where they were eliminated on away goals in the second round after a 2–2 aggregate draw with Segunda División B side Real Unión.

Squad

Left club during season

La Liga

Appearances and goals
Last updated on 16 May 2021.

|-
|colspan="12"|Players who have left the club after the start of the season:

|}

See also
Deportivo Alavés
1999–2000 La Liga
1999–2000 Copa del Rey

References

Deportivo Alavés seasons
Deportivo Alavés